Bala Dashteh (also Romanized as Bālā Dashteh; also known as Vālā Dasht and Valā Dasht) is a village in Helilan Rural District, Helilan District, Chardavol County, Ilam Province, Iran. At the 2006 census, its population was 25, in 7 families. The village is populated by Kurds.

References 

Populated places in Chardavol County
Kurdish settlements in Ilam Province